Luis María Díaz De Otazu (born 11 August 1966) is a Spanish former professional racing cyclist. He rode in the 1995 Tour de France.

References

External links

1966 births
Living people
Spanish male cyclists
Sportspeople from Álava
Cyclists from the Basque Country (autonomous community)